The Laurels is an original classic greyhound competition held at Perry Barr Stadium. It was run at Wimbledon Stadium from 1930 until 1997. It then moved to Belle Vue Stadium in 1998 and remained there until 2017 when it switched to Newcastle Stadium. After two years at Newcastle and a cancellation in 2020 due to COVID-19 it switched to Perry Barr in 2021.

competition lost its Category 1 status but was still regarded as one of the most valuable prizes during the racing year. The Arena Racing Company gained the prestigious competition in 2017 from the GRA and it returned to Category 1 status in 2022.

Past winners

Venues and distances 
1930–1974 (Wimbledon Stadium, 500 y) 
1975–1997 (Wimbledon Stadium, 460 m)
1998-1998 (Belle Vue Stadium, 460 m)
1999–2002 (Belle Vue Stadium, 465 m)
2003–2003 (Belle Vue Stadium, 480 m)
2004–2004 (Belle Vue Stadium, 465 m)
2005–2016 (Belle Vue Stadium, 470 m)
2017–2019 (Newcastle Stadium, 480 m)
2021–present (Perry Barr Stadium, 480 m)

Sponsors
1994–1998 Ike Morris Bookmakers
2003–2006 William Hill
2007–2009 & 2011 Betfred
2010–2010 Stan James
2012–2012 Ladbrokes
2013–2015 ECC Timber
2016–2016 Racing Post GTV
2017–2017 O'Tooles Boxing Health & Fitness Byker 
2018–2018 Conlon Family And Pinpoint Recruitment
2019–2019 O'Tooles Gym Byker 
2021–present Arena Racing Company

External links
Kilbrean Boy and The Laurels Pub

References

Greyhound racing competitions in the United Kingdom
Recurring sporting events established in 1930
Sport in Newcastle upon Tyne
Greyhound racing in London